Fifteenmile Creek is a  long tributary of the Columbia River in the U.S. state of Oregon. It drains  of Hood River and Wasco counties. Arising in the Cascade Range near Mount Hood, it flows northeast then west to its confluence with the Columbia near The Dalles.

Course
Fifteenmile Creek's headwaters are near Lookout Mountain in the Cascade Range, east of Mount Hood. It flows northeast, crossing into Wasco County and gathering small tributaries such as Ramsey Creek and Pine Creek. Traveling through the city of Dufur, the creek is crossed by Highway 197. Fifteenmile Creek receives Dry Creek on the right downstream of Dufur, turning north. It then flows west, receiving Eightmile Creek on the left while paralleling the Columbia River. The creek is crossed by Interstate 84/Highway 30 just before its mouth.

Watershed
Fifteenmile Creek drains  of the Columbia Plateau region of Oregon. Fifteen percent of the watershed is located in Mount Hood National Forest and therefore owned by the United States Forest Service, while the remaining eighty-five percent is privately owned.

Fish
Several species of anadromous fish inhabit streams in the watershed, including steelhead, Pacific lamprey, chinook and coho salmon. Fifteenmile Creek is the easternmost tributary of the Columbia home to winter steelhead. Fifteenmile Creek coho salmon populations are within the Lower Columbia River Coho Evolutionary Significant Unit and are listed as threatened (2011). Populations have declined in recent years, due to a combination of overfishing, an increase of hydroelectric dams, and general worsening of habitat conditions.

See also

 List of longest streams of Oregon
 List of rivers of Oregon

References

External Links

Rivers of Hood River County, Oregon
Rivers of Wasco County, Oregon
Rivers of Oregon
Wild and Scenic Rivers of the United States